Sun Jun (born 29 April 1993 in Wangqing County, Yanbian) is a Chinese footballer of Korean descent who currently plays for Chinese Super League side Changchun Yatai.

Club career
Sun Jun started his professional football career in 2012 when he was promoted to Yanbian FC's first squad. On 5 March 2016, Sun made his Super League debut in the first match of 2016 season against Shanghai Shenhua.

In February 2019, Sun transferred to newly-relegated League One side Changchun Yatai.

Career statistics
Statistics accurate as of match played 31 December 2020.

Honours

Club
Yanbian FC
 China League One: 2015

References

External links
 

1993 births
Living people
Chinese footballers
People from Wangqing County
Yanbian Funde F.C. players
Changchun Yatai F.C. players
Chinese Super League players
China League One players
Chinese people of Korean descent
Association football forwards